Calliopsis hesperia is a species of bee in the family Andrenidae. It is found in North America.

Subspecies
These two subspecies belong to the species Calliopsis hesperia:
 Calliopsis hesperia equina (Cockerell, 1925)
 Calliopsis hesperia hesperia

References

Further reading

 
 

Andrenidae
Articles created by Qbugbot
Insects described in 1907